"Christmas Drillings" is a song by the British YouTube group Sidemen featuring British rapper Jme. The song was written and performed by KSI, TBJZL, Vikkstar123, and Jme as part of a Sidemen Sunday video. The song was produced by Nyge.

Background 
The song is one of two singles released on 5 December as part of the weekly Sidemen Sunday videos in which two teams are selected to either be on the "good team" with a budget of $100,000 or the "bad team", which has a budget of $100. KSI, TBJZL, Vikkstar123 and Jme were selected for the good team while Miniminter, Behzinga, Zerkaa, W2S and Randolph were selected for the bad team. The good team wrote and recorded a Christmas tune titled "Christmas Drillings" with references to the roadman style of living during the festive season using a drill type beat produced by Nyge. The bad team wrote and recorded a Christmas tune titled "This or That" in which they make references to Santa Claus breaking and entering while delivering presents. 

The group declared that the song with the most music video views and streams would be crowned the winner and all proceeds generated donated to FareShare.

Track listing

Credits and personnel 
Credits adapted from Tidal.

 Nyge – production, mixing, mastering
 KSI – songwriting, vocals
 TBJZL – songwriting, vocals
 Vikkstar123 – songwriting, vocals
 Jme – songwriting, vocals

Charts

Weekly charts

Year-end charts

Release history

References 

2022 singles
2022 songs
British Christmas songs
Christmas charity singles
Jme (musician) songs
KSI songs
Songs written by KSI